Kadalangudi  is a village in the Kudavasal taluk of Tiruvarur district in Tamil Nadu, India.

Demographics 

As per the 2011 census, Kadalangudi had a population of 1,406 with 724 males and 682 females. The sex ratio was 942. The literacy rate was 80.8.

References 

 

Villages in Tiruvarur district